The Kangaroo Island Council is a local government area in South Australia that covers the entirety of Kangaroo Island, 13 km off the coast of the mainland. The council was formed on the 28 November 1996 by the amalgamation of the District Council of Kingscote and the District Council of Dudley. Its first meeting held on 11 December 1996. 

The seat of the council is located in the island's largest town, Kingscote. The district's population at the 2016 census was approximately 4,700.

Elected members
Mayor: Michael Pengilly 
CEO: Greg Georgopoulos

Councillors: 	

Bob Teasdale
Ken Liu
Peter Denholm
Peter Tiggemann
Rosalie Chirgwin
Sam Mumford
Shirley Pledge
David Mepham 
Richard Cotterill

Economy

The district's economy is based around agriculture, with grazing, crops, viticulture and forestry prevalent. Fishing, and more recently, aquaculture has been established as an economic viability on the island.  
Tourism is also a contributor to the economy, with tourists coming to the island for its natural environment and history.

Localities
Localities within the jurisdiction of the Kangaroo Island Council are as follows:  American Beach,  American River,  Antechamber Bay, Ballast Head,  Baudin Beach, Bay of Shoals,  Birchmore,  Brown Beach,  Brownlow KI, Cape Borda,  Cassini,  Cuttlefish Bay, Cygnet River,  De Mole River, D'Estrees Bay,  Dudley East,  Dudley West,  Duncan,  Emu Bay, Flinders Chase, Gosse,  Haines,  Island Beach, Ironstone,  Kangaroo Head, Karrata,  Kingscote,  Kohinoor,  MacGillivray,  Menzies,  Middle River,  Muston,  Nepean Bay,  Newland,  North Cape,  Parndana,  Pelican Lagoon,  Penneshaw,  Porky Flat,  Sapphiretown,  Seal Bay,  Seddon,  Stokes Bay, Stun'Sail Boom,  Vivonne Bay,  Western River,  Willoughby,  Willson River, and  Wisanger.

See also
List of parks and gardens in rural South Australia
Kangaroo Island (disambiguation)

References

External links
Council Website
Tourism Site

Kangaroo Island
Local government areas of South Australia